Héctor Saúl de Matta Balán (born 1 July 1981) is a Guatemalan football midfielder who plays for local club Xelajú in the Guatemala's top division.

Club career
De Matta has been at the Cremas for the large part of his career, making his debut in 2004.

International career
De Matta made his professional debut for Guatemala in an August 2006 friendly match against Haiti and has, as of January 2010, earned a total of 12 caps, scoring no goals. He has represented his country during the 2007 CONCACAF Gold Cup campaign.

He has also played for Guatemala at the 2000 FIFA Futsal World Cup.

External links
 Player profile - CSD Comunicaciones

References

Living people
People from Chimaltenango Department
Guatemalan footballers
Guatemala international footballers
Comunicaciones F.C. players
2007 UNCAF Nations Cup players
2007 CONCACAF Gold Cup players
Association football defenders
Association football midfielders
1981 births